Stockport Academy is a non-selective co-educational school within the English Academy programme, located in Cheadle Heath, Stockport, Greater Manchester. It caters for children aged 11–16 and has approximately 869 pupils on roll.

History
The school opened officially in September 2007 as a replacement of Avondale High School, which later moved into a new building in 2008, which was constructed on the same site by Bowmer & Kirkland, the school run by academy organisation United Learning, formerly the United Church Schools Trust. which opened the academy after Avondale was to be shut down. It is operated on a non-denominational basis, but followed the Christian, specifically Church of England, ethos of its parent organisation.

Academics
"At Stockport Academy we aim to ensure that all students have a balanced curriculum that inspires and challenges them." Stockport Academy . The academy has chosen to run a three year Key Stage 3; it is moving to a system in Years 7 and 8, initially in English and Maths only of  monitoring  performance  against  targets  (key  performance  indicators). 
At Key Stage 4, the school helps the student choose an appropriate pathway. Generally they encourage the student to access a broad curriculum by considering all subjects including Languages, Humanities and Computer Science alongside the other core and practical subjects, citing the wishes of employers and universities. These will include the English Baccalaureate suite of subjects; English, Maths, Science, Language, History or Geography.
 
The school selects students for the oversubscribed courses by considering their attendance (the higher better), current effort and performance, the number of negative behaviour points has gained (the lower the better). Attendance at relevant Key Stage 3 enrichment clubs and contribution to wider school life (charity work etc.).

Ofsted Report

In March 2015, Ofsted recognized Stockport Academy as a Good school, with Outstanding features.
Highlights of the report included recognition that the behavior of students is "impeccable" and students have "total confidence that they are well cared for".
Other findings in the report include the recognition that students "achieve well" and teachers have "high expectations and aspirations" for their students.

An inspection in 2018 confirmed the school remains good and recommendations have been followed.

Alumni
Angela Rayner (born 1980), politician, Deputy Leader of the Labour Party since 2020
Phil Foden (born 2000),  footballer, Manchester City

See also
List of schools in Stockport

References

External links
 Stockport Academy website
 ULT academies
 Ofsted: Stockport Academy
Stockport Express article

Educational institutions established in 2007
Academies in the Metropolitan Borough of Stockport
Secondary schools in the Metropolitan Borough of Stockport
United Learning schools
Schools in Stockport
2007 establishments in England